Davor Jozić (born 22 September 1960) is a Bosnian retired footballer.

Club career
Jozić started playing at a local club FK Igman Konjic and then he moved to FK Sarajevo where he played in 450 games. He was a member of the memorable Sarajevo squad that won the 1984–85 Yugoslav First League. After that, he played for such clubs as Cesena, Club América, and Spezia. He earned 27 caps and scored 2 goals for the Yugoslavia national football team from 1984 to 1991, and played in the 1990 FIFA World Cup. He scored two goals in world cup 1990 group stages: one a headed goal against eventual tournament winners West Germany in a 4–1 defeat and the winner against Colombia in a 1-0 yugoslav win

International career
He made his debut for Yugoslavia in a September 1984 friendly match away against Scotland and has earned a total of 27 caps, scoring 2 goals. He played in 5 matches at the 1990 FIFA World Cup in Italy. His final international was a May 1991 European Championship qualification match against Denmark.

Later years
He was Fabrizio Castori's assistant coach at Cesena.

References

External links

Davor Jozić at reprezentacija.rs 

1960 births
Living people
People from Konjic
Association football defenders
Yugoslav footballers
Bosnia and Herzegovina footballers
Bosnia and Herzegovina expatriate footballers
Yugoslavia international footballers
Olympic footballers of Yugoslavia
Footballers at the 1988 Summer Olympics
1990 FIFA World Cup players
FK Sarajevo players
A.C. Cesena players
Club América footballers
Spezia Calcio players
Yugoslav First League players
Serie A players
Serie B players
Liga MX players
Serie C players
Yugoslav expatriate footballers
Expatriate footballers in Italy
Yugoslav expatriate sportspeople in Italy
Bosnia and Herzegovina expatriate sportspeople in Italy
Expatriate footballers in Mexico
Bosnia and Herzegovina expatriate sportspeople in Mexico